The COVID-19 pandemic has had a significant impact on the music industry, mirroring its impacts across all arts sectors. Numerous music events, including music festivals, concert tours, and award shows, have been cancelled or postponed. While some musicians and composers were able to use the time to create new works, there were flow-on effects on the many supporting people who relied on performers for their income. Various album releases have been delayed as well. Pollstar estimated the total lost revenue for the live music industry in 2020 at more than $30 billion.

Music events 
Many concert tours, music festivals, and other events have been canceled or postponed.

Impacted music festivals

Impacted music conferences

Impacted concert performances

Impacted concert tours

Impacted concert residencies

Impacted benefit concerts

Impacted award ceremonies and song contests

Album releases 

Several musical artists delayed the releases of albums amid the pandemic. The Record Store Day, which would have seen the release of several re-issues and exclusive material, was rescheduled from April 18 to June 20. But added with 3 dates: August 29, September 26, and October 24. In contrast, some musical acts, such as Dua Lipa, Sufjan Stevens, and Laura Marling, moved up the release dates of their upcoming albums. Others, such as Taylor Swift, Nine Inch Nails, Phish, X, and Fiona Apple, released new albums with little or no advanced notice.

Many albums have had release dates pushed back as a result of the pandemic, including:

Virtual performances
Many artists elected to stream performances online. Virtual concerts, such as the iHeart Living Room Concert for America and Together at Home, were organised to provide entertainment to the public, and to raise awareness methods to combat the virus, notably social distancing. Artists such as Christine and the Queens, Ben Gibbard, and Katharine McPhee broadcast daily livestream performances from their homes. Several major bands including Pink Floyd, Radiohead, and Metallica offered free livestreams of archival concerts, as did several in the jam band scene, including Phish, Dead & Company, Widespread Panic, and The String Cheese Incident.

In April 2020, Beyond Live, the first paid concert streaming service in the world which provides full-scaled live online concert aided by technology – including augmented reality and real-time interactions between artists and live audience – was launched to deliver K-pop concerts. Since its creation, multiple K-pop artists have delivered full-length live concerts via this platform, and other K-pop entertainment enterprises started to produce virtual live concerts in similar format throughout 2020.

On May 27, 2020, One Love Asia brings all artists and YouTubers together to perform in one big virtual concert to heal the world against coronavirus and to protect and advance the welfare of all people.

In August 2020, the American singer Bilal live streamed his three-day remote recording of an experimental three-song EP titled VOYAGE-19. Spanning 54 hours, he wrote, recorded, and produce one song per day in virtual collaborations with producer Tariq Khan and 30 other musicians, including Erykah Badu, Robert Glasper, Keyon Harrold, Marcus Strickland, Raymond Angry, Ben Williams, Brandee Younger, and Marcus Gilmore. The stream simultaneously showed the EP's artwork being made, with a group of three visual artists enlisted for each song, including Angelbert Metoyer. Proceeds from the sale of the broadcast's pre-order and the EP's digital download were distributed among the participants, a number of whom were struggling financially due to the pandemic.

In November 2020, Taylor Swift released a concert film, titled Folklore: The Long Pond Studio Sessions, to Disney+. The film saw Swift, Aaron Dessner and Jack Antonoff quarantine themselves in an isolated recording studio and perform live every song from her eighth studio album, Folklore (2020). In September 2021, Billie Eilish similarly released a concert film to Disney+, titled Happier Than Ever: A Love Letter to Los Angeles, where she performed live every song from her second studio album Happier Than Ever (2021) at an empty Hollywood Bowl alongside her brother Finneas O'Connell, with guest appearances from well-known musical figures in Los Angeles.

Songs and recordings inspired by the COVID-19 pandemic and its effects

See also
 2020 in music
 2020 in rock music/2021 in rock music
 National Independent Venue Association

References 

2020 in music
 
Music industry